My Funny Valentine is an album by American jazz pianist Larry Willis recorded in 1988 and originally released on the Japanese Jazz City label before being reissued in the US on Evidence Music in 1998.

Reception 

Allmusic's Michael G. Nastos said: "the Willis heard on 1988's enjoyable, if conventional, My Funny Valentine is a more conservative post-bopper/hard bopper ... Willis plays the acoustic piano exclusively on this CD, and standards are a high priority. Nothing cutting-edge occurs, just straight-ahead jazz that's honest, warm and melodic. ... all of which demonstrate how sensitive a ballad player he can be".

Track listing
 "For Openers" (Kenny Garrett) – 5:46
 "It Could Happen to You" (Jimmy Van Heusen, Johnny Burke) – 3:18
 "Blues for Wynton Kelly" (Larry Willis) – 6:32
 "Who's Kidding Who?" (Gerard D'Angelo) – 8:52
 "Rhythm-a-Ning" (Thelonious Monk) – 6:04	
 "Blood Count" (Billy Strayhorn) – 6:29
 "My Shining Hour/I'll Be Seeing You" (Harold Arlen, Johnny Mercer/ Sammy Fain, Irving Kahal) – 6:46
 "Lazy Afternoon" (Jerome Moross, John La Touche) – 5:16
 "Ethiopia" (Willis) – 8:02
 "My Funny Valentine" (Richard Rodgers, Lorenz Hart) – 6:02

Personnel
Larry Willis – piano
Kenny Garrett – alto saxophone (tracks 1, 5 & 9)
George Mraz – bass
Al Foster – drums

References

Evidence Music albums
Larry Willis albums
1988 albums